Società Costruzioni Industriali Milano, better known as Socimi, was an Italian manufacturing company based in Milan. It was a manufacturer of trams, metro trains; traction motors for these and for trolleybuses; and bodies for motorbuses and trolleybuses. It also manufactured weapons, such as rifles. The company was founded by engineer Alessandro Marzocco in 1969 and was declared insolvent in 1994 due to its involvement in the Mani pulite scandal in 1992. The remains of said company were subsequently placed into receivership in 2002, and in 2014 an arrangement proposal ("proposta di concordato") to settle the company's remaining liabilities was made by the company Assuntore San Tommaso Uno, controlled by the US investment company Värde Partners.

Trolleybus systems, which purchased Socimi trolleybuses, included the systems of Cagliari, Milan, Modena and Salerno.  The company supplied trams only to Rome, but collaborated with Bombardier Transportation in the development of the Eurotram for the Strasbourg tramway in France. Heavy rail trains produced by Socimi included the FNM Socimi coaches for Ferrovie Nord Milano as well as EMU300 trains for Taiwan Railways Administration.

Firearms

SOCIMI produced the Socimi Type 821 submachine gun in the 1980s.

References

External links

Defunct manufacturing companies of Italy
Defunct firearms manufacturers
Firearm manufacturers of Italy
Defunct rolling stock manufacturers of Italy
Bus manufacturers of Italy
Electric vehicle manufacturers of Italy
Trolleybus manufacturers